Giancarlo Gloder (born 10 May 1945) is an Italian speed skater. He competed at the 1968 Winter Olympics and the 1972 Winter Olympics.

References

External links
 

1945 births
Living people
Italian male speed skaters
Olympic speed skaters of Italy
Speed skaters at the 1968 Winter Olympics
Speed skaters at the 1972 Winter Olympics
Sportspeople from the Province of Vicenza